The 2007–2008 UCI Cyclo-cross World Cup events and season-long competition takes place between 21 October 2007 and 20 January 2008 and is sponsored by the Union Cycliste Internationale (UCI). Nine events are organised, a reduction of two from the 2006/07 UCI Cyclo-cross World Cup. In addition, not all events have races for each category, so that there are 8 rounds for elite men, 7 for elite women, and 5 for under-23 and junior men. Individual classifications for elite men and women were discontinued after the previous season, with more emphasis put on the UCI classifications.

Events

See also
 2007–08 Cyclo-cross Superprestige
 2007–08 Cyclo-cross Gazet van Antwerpen

External links
 Cyclo-cross.info  
 Official website

World Cup
World Cup
UCI Cyclo-cross World Cup